Christoph Lauenstein (born 20 March 1962 in Hildesheim, West Germany) is a German producer, director and writer.

Lauenstein entered the School of Fine Arts in Kassel, Germany in 1985. While enrolled at the school Lauenstein, together with his twin brother Wolfgang, created the animated short film Balance. It received an Academy Award in the animated short film category in 1990. The Lauensteins have created a number of animation works for advertising (including station idents for MTV), as well as directing and providing the screenplay for two animated feature films Luis and the Aliens and Spy Cat (both 2018).

References

Works cited
 Olivier Cotte (2007) Secrets of Oscar-winning animation: Behind the scenes of 13 classic short animations. (Making of '"Balance"'') Focal Press.

External links
Lauenstein & Lauenstein official site
Bio and filmography at Acme Filmworks
 

1962 births
Living people
Directors of Best Animated Short Academy Award winners
German twins
People from Hildesheim
Film people from Lower Saxony